Mohammad-Ali Fardin  (4 February 1931 – 6 April 2000) was a prominent Iranian actor, film director and freestyle wrestler.

Biography

Early life
Fardin was born and raised in a poor area in southern Tehran. He was the eldest of three children. After graduating from high school, Fardin joined the Air Force and became a freestyle wrestler in his twenties; he won a silver medal at the 1954 World Wrestling Championships and placed fourth in 1957.

Acting
Fardin was a popular lead actor in Iranian cinema, and was known by the title, King of Hearts, after his lead role in an Iranian film of the same title (Soltane Ghalbha).

He rose to fame in the 1960s. For the average Iranian, he was a heroic figure who served as an alternative to non Iranian movie stars. He was stereotypically cast as the poor tough guy with the heart of gold who got the girl at the end. His films include, Behesht Door Nist, Ghazal, and Ganje Qarun. After the 1979 Iranian Revolution, he starred in only two more films, Bar Faraz -e- Asemanha and Barzakhiha.

He also acted in the Indo Iranian Bollywood film Subah O Sham (1972) starring alongside Waheeda Rehman, Sanjeev Kapoor, Simin Ghaffari and Azar. The film was directed by Tapi Chanakya. His voice in the film was dubbed by Satyen Kappu.

Post-Revolutionary Limitations
Fardin was banned from working for almost the entire time that he lived through the post-revolutionary period. He could only act in one film, The Imperilled (Barzakhi-ha), which was released in 1982 and resulted in his life-time ban. The Imperilled was directed by Iraj Ghaderi and had four pre-revolutionary male stars in the lead roles. With its patriotic story about resisting foreign invasion, it was a chance for Fardin, Malek-Motiei, Ghaderi and Rad to renew their threatened careers as actors in the post-revolutionary atmosphere. The film was a hit and became the highest grossing Iranian film of all time in its short period of screening in theaters. But it was soon banned and consequently the four actors were banned from working. Saeed Motalebi, an established writer and director in the pre-revolutionary era, was the writer of the film. He is one of the people who has repeatedly recounted stories about how the film and the actors were banned. About how the film's success was turned into disaster Motalebi says: In one friday Mr. Mohsen Makhmalbaf gathered a couple of people and they started collecting signatures for a petition which was written on a scroll, stating that "We have made a revolution while these actors are transgressors." They did it right in front of that theater in the Revolution Square near the university of Tehran. They said "Look how theaters are crowded while friday events are deserted." That's how they stopped my film.
Then a reporter who was queued to ask something about our film, went and told the then prime minister (Mir-Hossein Mousavi) "There is a film in theaters whose writer wants to convey that people who are fighting in the fronts are problematic persons." The prime minister replied "These are leftovers of junk intellectuals who will soon go to the dustbin of history." Malek-Motiei became jobless and turned his garage into a pastry shop. Ghaderi put some rice bags in his office and became a rice dealer. Fardin opened a pastry shop too and when I went to visit him, I used to wait outside as long as there were no customers so that he wouldn't feel ashamed when he saw me. These were all caused by those illogical efforts which I will never forgive.

Death
Fardin died as a result of cardiac arrest on 6 April 2000 at the age of 69. The news of his death was largely ignored by state radio and television, which was run according to the dictates of the Islamic establishment, who had disapproved of his acting career and had banned his films post the 1979 revolution. He was buried in the Behesht-e-Zahra cemetery in Tehran. More than 20,000 mourners attended his funeral in Tehran.

Filmography 

Director
 1962 : Hungry Wolves (Gorg-haye Gorosneh)
 1965 : Love and Revenge (Eshgh-o Entegham)
 1965 : The Prettiest of All (Khoshgel-e Khoshgela)
 1966 : The Beggars of Tehran (Gedayan-e Tehran)
 1966 : The Most Bounteous (Hatam-e Tahei)
 1968 : King of the Hearts (Solatan-e Ghalb-ha)
 1969 : The Golden Castle (Ghasr-e Zarrin)
 1972 : Hell + Me (Jahannam + Man)
 1973 : Story of the Night (Ghesse-ye Shab)
 1975 : The Great Promise (Gharar-e Bozorg)
 1978 : Over the Clouds (Bar Faraz-e Aseman-ha)

Producer
 Gorg-haye Gorosne (1962)
 Khoshgel-e Khoshgela (1965)
 Sekke-ye Shans (1970)
 Jahanam + Man (1972)
 Ghesse-ye Shab (1973)
 Gharar Bozorg (1975)
 Bar Faraz-e Aseman-ha (1978)

Writer
 Eshgh-o Entegham (1965)
 Khoshgel-e Khoshgela (1965)
 Hatam-e Tahei (1966)
 Solatan-e Ghalb-ha (1968)
 Ghesse-ye Shab (1973)

Actor

 Cheshme-ye Ab-e Hayat (1960)
 Farda Roshan Ast (1960)
 Faryad-e Nime Shab (1961) - Amir
 Bive-haye Khandan (1961)
 Dokhtari Faryad Mikeshad (1962)
 Tala-ye Sefid (1962)
 Gorg-haye Gorosne (1962)
 Zamin-e Talkh (1962)
 Zan-ha Fereshte-and (1963)
 Sahel-e Entezar (1963) - Ahmad
 Agha-ye Gharn-e Bistom (1964) - Dash Habib
 Masir-e Roodkhaneh (1964) - Mahmood
 Ensan-ha (1964) - Amir
 Tarane-haye Roostaei (1964)
 Jahanam Zir-e Pa-ye Man (1964) - Yargholi
 Dehkade-ye Talaei (1965)
 Ghahraman-e Gharamanan (1965) - Hassan Ferfere
 Babr-e Koohestan (1965) - Majid
 Eshgh-o Entegham (1965)
 Khoshgel-e Khoshgela (1965)
 Ganj-e Gharoon (1965) - Ali bigham
 Moo Tatalei-e Shahre Ma (1965)
 Hatam-e Taei (1966) - Jalal
 AmirArsalan-e Namdar (1966) - Amir Arsalan
 Mardi az Tehran (1966)
 Gadayan-e Tehran (1966)
 Jahan Pahlavan (1966)
 Wadi al mot (1967)
 Toofan-e Nooh (1967)
 Charkh-e Falak (1967) - Mamal Feshfesheh
 Toofan Bar Faraz-e Patra (1968)
 Ed ora... raccomanda l'anima a Dio! (1968) - Stanley Maserick
 Soltan-e Ghalb-ha (1968) - Saeed
 Shokooh-e Javanmardi (1968)
 Khashm-e Kowli (1968)
 Mardan-e Bokos (1968)
 Na’re Toofan (1969) - Toofan
 Donya-ye Por Omid (1969)
 Ghasr-e Zarrin (1969) - The Youngest Son
 Donya-ye poromid (1969)
 Behesht Door Nist (1969)
 Sekke-ye Shans (1970)
 Yaghoot-e Se Cheshm (1970)
 Mardi az Jonoob-e Shahr (1970) - Hadi
 Kooche Mard-ha (1970) - Ali
 Ayoob (1971) - Ayyoob
 Yek Khoshkel va Hezar Moshkel (1971)
 Mard-e Hezar Labkhand (1971)
 Baba Shamal (1971) - Baba Shamal
 Mi’adGah-e Khashm (1971) - Ghadam
 Mardan-e Khashen (1971) - Nasir
 Homa-ye Sa’adat (1971) - Aram
 Raze Derakhte Senjed (1971)
 Jahanam + Man (1972)
 Subah-O-Shaam (Persian: همای سعادت) is a 1972 Indo-Iranian film
 Jabbar, Sarjookhe Farari (1973)
 Ghesse-ye Shab (1973) - Mohsen
 Shekast Napazir (1974) - Akbar
 Salam bar Eshgh (1974)
 Najoor-ha (1974)
 Javanmard (1974)
 Movazebe Kolat Bash (1975) - Farhad
 Ta’asob (1975)
 Gharar-e Bozorg (1975) - Amir
 Ghazal (1976) - Hojjat
 Bar Faraz-e Aseman-ha (1978) - Ramin / Shahin
 Barzakhi-ha'' (1982) - Seyyed Yaqub (final film role)

References

Sources

External links

 Photograph of Mohammad-Ali Fardin
 Photograph of Mohammad-Ali Fardin's grave

1931 births
2000 deaths
Iranian wrestlers
People from Tehran
Iranian screenwriters
Iranian film directors
Male actors from Tehran
Sportspeople from Tehran
Iranian male film actors
Iranian male sport wrestlers
20th-century Iranian male actors
World Wrestling Championships medalists
Burials at artist's block of Behesht-e Zahra